Dereboğazı can refer to the following places in Turkey:

 Dereboğazı, Elâzığ
 Dereboğazı, Palandöken